The 2004 Iowa State Senate elections took place as part of the biennial 2004 United States elections. Iowa voters elected state senators in half of the state senate's districts—the 25 even-numbered state senate districts. State senators serve four-year terms in the Iowa State Senate, with half of the seats up for election each cycle.

The primary election on June 8, 2004 determined which candidates appeared on the November 2, 2004 general election ballot. Primary election results can be obtained here. General election results can be obtained here.

On election day in November 2004, Republicans had control of the Iowa state Senate with 29 seats.

To take control of the chamber from Republicans, the Democrats needed to net 5 Senate seats.

The result of the 2004 election was an evenly-divided Iowa state Senate with Democrats netting 4 flips and the resulting balance being 25 seats held both by Democrats and Republicans. As a result, Jeff Lamberti and Jack Kibbie were deemed co-Senate Presidents for the Republican & Democratic halves, respectively.

Summary of Results
NOTE: Only even-numbered Iowa Senate seats were up for regularly-scheduled election in 2004.

Source:

Detailed Results

Note: If a district does not list a primary, then that district did not have a competitive primary (i.e., there may have only been one candidate file for that district).

District 2

District 4

District 6

District 8

District 10

District 12

District 14

District 16

District 18

District 20

District 22

District 24

District 26

District 28

District 30

District 32

District 34

District 36

District 38

District 40

District 42

District 44

District 46

District 48

District 50

See also
 United States elections, 2004
 United States House of Representatives elections in Iowa, 2004
 Elections in Iowa

References

2004 Iowa elections
Iowa Senate elections
Iowa State Senate